Parquet (French for "a small compartment") is a geometric mosaic of wood pieces used for decorative effect in flooring.

Parquet patterns are often entirely geometrical and angular—squares, triangles, lozenges—but may contain curves.  The most popular parquet flooring pattern is herringbone.

Etymology

The word derives from the Old French parchet (the diminutive of parc), literally meaning "a small enclosed space".

History

Large diagonal squares known as parquet de Versailles were introduced in 1684 as parquet de menuiserie ("woodwork parquet") to replace the marble flooring that required constant washing, which tended to rot the joists beneath the floors. Such parquets en losange were noted by the Swedish architect Daniel Cronström at Versailles and at the Grand Trianon in 1693.

Materials
Timber contrasting in color and grain, such as oak, walnut, cherry, lime, pine, maple etc. are sometimes employed, and in the more expensive kinds the richly coloured mahogany and sometimes other tropical hardwoods are also used. While not technically a wood, bamboo is also a popular material for modern floors.

Parquet floors were formerly usually adhered with hot bitumen. Today modern cold adhesives are usually used.

Repair

Parquet floors are usually long lasting if maintained correctly . Unstuck blocks are re-glued. Bitumen-glued blocks require use of either hot bitumen, cold bitumen emulsion, or a spirit based parquet adhesive.

Domestic use
Parquet floors are often found in bedrooms and hallways. They are considered better than regular floor tiles since they feel warmer underfoot. However they do little to absorb sounds such as walking, vacuum cleaning and television, which can cause problems in multi-occupancy dwellings.

Basketball courts

One of the most famous parquet floors is the one used by the Boston Celtics of the NBA. The original floor, which was installed at the Celtics' original home of Boston Arena in 1946, was moved intact to Boston Garden in 1952 and used there until the team moved to what was then known as FleetCenter in 1995, now known as TD Garden. The floor remained intact and in use until it was cut up and sold as souvenirs in 1999, after the 1998 demolition of Boston Garden. The Celtics today play on a parquet floor inside TD Garden that combines old and new sections. In 2018 the Celtics constructed a new parquet floor for use in their new Auerbach Center practice facility. It is the only NBA court floor made from red oak; all others are made from rock maple.

Similar square-paneled parquet floors, albeit in maple, were made for the Orlando Magic, Minnesota Timberwolves, Denver Nuggets, and New Jersey Nets. Of the four, only the Magic continue to use a square-paneled parquet floor (starting in 1989 at the Orlando Arena, and moved to Amway Center in 2010). The Nets debuted their parquet at the Meadowlands Arena in 1988, and continued to use the floor until 1997; the floor remained in use with the Seton Hall basketball team until 2007. The Nuggets used a parquet floor from 1990 to 1993 at the McNichols Sports Arena, while the Timberwolves played on a parquet floor from 1996 to 2008 at the Target Center.

In 1995, the Toronto Raptors debuted with a herringbone parquet, and used the floor until 1999 while playing in three different home venues: SkyDome, Copps Coliseum and Maple Leaf Gardens. The Nets revived the use of the herringbone upon moving to the Barclays Center in 2012. However, its sister WNBA team (since 2019), the New York Liberty, continue to use a traditional floor at the venue.

While the Charlotte Hornets unveiled a parquet-like floor at the Time Warner Cable Arena for the 2014–15 season, it is not considered a true parquet floor. Instead, it simulated the pattern of the parquet by alternately painting light and dark trapezoid sections through the use of varnish, forming a beehive pattern that is synonymous with the franchise. In 2021 the Hornets changed its court design, relegating the trapezoids to midcourt.

See also
 Wood flooring
 Marquetry
 Hardwood
 Harewood
 Tessellation
 Tunbridge ware

Notes and references

External links 

  J. W. Boughton - Wood Flooring Pamphlet (1907) Kenneth Franzheim II Rare Books Room, William R. Jenkins Architecture and Art Library, University of Houston Digital Library.

Floors
Composite materials
Surface decorative techniques in woodworking
Woodworking